() is a Tibetan religious title. Rinpoche means "precious one". The current Samdhong Rinpoche is Lobsang Tenzin, who is considered by Tibetan buddhists to be the reincarnation of the 4th Samdhong Rinpoche.

List of Samdhong Rinpoche

References

Lamas
Tulkus
Samdhong Rinpoche